Fernando Miguel Palma Suazo (born 10 February 1993) is a Honduran diplomat, model and film and television actor. He is known as the cultural ambassador of Honduras to Taiwan.

Biography 
Palma was born in Tegucigalpa, Honduras, on 10 February 1993. Although he was born and raised in Honduras, Palma is also of mixed race: his father is from Italy and his mother is from Honduras. In his youth, he attended the bilingual Elvel school in Honduras. Palma studied Industrial Engineering at the Catholic University of Honduras. In 2015, he moved from Honduras to Taiwan. Two years later, he completed his master's studies in Industrial Engineering and Management at the Yuan Ze University. The Taiwanese government recognized Fernando Palma as the first Latin American to enter the country's entertainment industry. He has become a Latin American media personality in the film and entertainment industry in Taiwan. He is fluent in Spanish, English, Mandarin and Taiwanese.

Film and television 
He acted for sports brands in Taiwan. He has been recognized as a cultural Ambassador for his impact as a young Latino in Taiwanese society.

Filmography

Films

Variety Show

Published works

Awards and nominations

References 
Notes

Citations

External links 

 
 Al Banquillo – Mr. Fernando Palma (in Spanish) at Televicentro (Honduras)

1993 births
Honduran male actors
Honduran models
Living people